Rossmoor is an unincorporated community and census-designated place (CDP) located within Monroe Township in Middlesex County, New Jersey, United States. As of the 2010 United States Census, the CDP's population was 2,666.

Rossmoor is a gated age-restricted co-op, active adult community . Rossmoor covers  just off Exit 8A of the New Jersey Turnpike (Interstate 95). It has 2,303 residences, encircling a  championship golf course. Many residents continue to work in the area or commute to New York City. Express buses stop at Rossmoor for the 55-minute ride to the Port Authority Bus Terminal on 42nd Street in Midtown Manhattan.

History
The concept of a “Senior Community” was an unknown entity in the building trade of the early 1960’s. But a man from California had already begun to change that by building three successful “Senior Communities” in Southern California. And then – in 1963 - this 47 year old builder was about to repeat his California success in New Jersey on the east coast. That person was Ross Cortese who started our community and after whom it is named. Through his contacts and research in 1962-63, Ross Cortese identified an area in central New Jersey that seemed to have all the right factors. He purchase available farm land directly adjacent to the New Jersey Turnpike (whose initial 118 miles had just been built between 1950-1952.) The land was near a large Country Club (the Forsgate Club), in business since 1931, which had already been successful in attracting a good clientele and which might also be available for purchase. He made sure to offer amenities that would attract buyers, and then he marketed the concept to the surrounding public. 

In 1963, Arthur Phillips, Esq., then a young lawyer with offices in the Heritage Building near what is now Rossmoor's North Gate, was hired by Cortese to act as attorney for the purchase of the necessary acreage. The purchase was a huge tract of land, covering the area that now includes today’s Adult Communities of Clearbrook, Concordia, Encore, the Ponds, Whittingham and all the Forsgate land including the Forsgate Country Club. Each Village was to have its own clubhouse and golf course. Total cost was expected to be $500 million. On May 8, 1964, the plans for the property were made public. The work on Village #1 began in earnest soon afterwards, and the Farmland appearance of Monroe changed abruptly. The last 6 months of 1966 was when construction began in earnest.

Over a 25 year period Rossmoor Village One was built out. As each section was completed a new sub association was established. Today there are 18 sub-associations called Mutuals in Village One (now known as Rossmoor). Rossmoor is overseen by a master association Board of Governors made up of each Mutual's presidents.  Together they assure the care and operation of the communities infrastructure and amenities and provide needed administrative and maintenance services to each Mutual and thus every owner.  

Although only one of the original five villages were ever developed by Mr. Cortese's company the spirit of his plan did eventually come to fruition through the construction of multiple active adult communities on the original land. His idea expanded even further into Monroe Township providing more and more affordable adult active housing options.

Geography
According to the United States Census Bureau, the CDP had a total area of 0.918 square miles (2.378 km2), including 0.904 square miles (2.343 km2) of land and 0.014 square miles (0.035 km2) of water (1.48%).

Demographics

Census 2010

Census 2000
As of the 2000 United States Census there were 3,129 people, 2,131 households, and 790 families living in the CDP. The population density was 1,342.3/km2 (3,466.9/mi2). There were 2,345 housing units at an average density of 1,006.0/km2 (2,598.2/mi2). The racial makeup of the CDP was 97.95% White, 0.96% African American, 0.10% Native American, 0.51% Asian, 0.06% from other races, and 0.42% from two or more races. Hispanic or Latino of any race were 0.51% of the population.

There were 2,131 households, out of which none had children under the age of 18 living with them, 33.8% were married couples living together, 2.6% had a female householder with no husband present, and 62.9% were non-families. 61.1% of all households were made up of individuals, and 56.4% had someone living alone who was 65 years of age or older. The average household size was 1.40 and the average family size was 2.03.

In the CDP the population was spread out, with 0.1% under the age of 18, 0.1% from 18 to 24, 0.6% from 25 to 44, 9.8% from 45 to 64, and 89.5% who were 65 years of age or older. The median age was 77 years. For every 100 females, there were 50.1 males. For every 100 females age 18 and over, there were 50.1 males.

The median income for a household in the CDP was $33,104, and the median income for a family was $41,847. Males had a median income of $65,385 versus $38,750 for females. The per capita income for the CDP was $31,178. About 1.1% of families and 4.3% of the population were below the poverty line, including none of those under age 18 and 3.1% of those age 65 or over.

References

External links
 Rossmoor community website

Census-designated places in Middlesex County, New Jersey
Monroe Township, Middlesex County, New Jersey